Klemen Štimulak (born 20 July 1990) is a Slovenian retired racing cyclist, who rode professionally between 2009 and 2015 for the  and  teams. He rode at the 2014 UCI Road World Championships.

Major results

2009
 7th Ljubljana–Zagreb
2010
 3rd Time trial, National Under-23 Road Championships
2011
 9th La Côte Picarde
2012
 3rd Time trial, National Under-23 Road Championships
 3rd Trofeo Banca Popolare di Vicenza
 6th Overall Coupe des nations Ville Saguenay
2013
 1st  Time trial, National Road Championships
 3rd Croatia–Slovenia
2014
 1st Giro del Medio Brenta
 1st  Mountains classification Tour of Slovenia
 2nd Time trial, National Road Championships
2015
 3rd Time trial, National Road Championships

References

External links

1990 births
Living people
Slovenian male cyclists
People from the Municipality of Dobrna